S.S. Murata is a Sanmarinese football club, based in Murata, a civil parish of the city of San Marino. The club was founded in 1966. Murata currently plays in Girone B of Campionato Sammarinese di Calcio. The team's colours are black and white.

Overview
They won their first Sammarinese national title in 2006, and repeated as champions the next two years.  As UEFA decided to include Sammarinese champions in the first preliminary round of the UEFA Champions League starting from the 2007–08 season, Murata were the first Sanmarinese team to take part in the main European competition (see below for details).  In order to reinforce the team, in July 2007 the club signed 41-year-old former Brazilian star and 1994 FIFA World Cup champion Aldair, gaining some headlines in the Italian sports news because of the move. Another former Serie A star, 43-year-old striker Massimo Agostini, played for Murata from 2005 to 2008. In July 2008, Murata announced that they were hoping to sign former Brazil international Romário so he could play in the club's upcoming UEFA Champions League fixtures. They also approached the former Formula One champion Michael Schumacher, but both declined Murata's offer.
On July 17, 2007, Murata became the first Sanmarinese team to play in a UEFA Champions League fixture, contesting a First Qualifying Round tie against Tampere United from Finland. The home game of the two-legged tie was played at San Marino Calcio's Olimpico Stadium and resulted in a 2–1 win for Tampere. Murata lost the away leg 2–0 and were eliminated.

Honours
 Campionato Sammarinese di Calcio: 3
 2005–06, 2006–07, 2007–08
 Coppa Titano: 3
 1997, 2007, 2008
 San Marino Federal Trophy: 3
 2006, 2008, 2009.

European record

Current squad
As of 28 September, 2021

 (Captain)

Managers

 Gianluigi Pasquali (–2008)
 Massimo Agostini (2008–10)
 Alberto Manca (2010–11)
 Ivo Crescentini (2012–13)
 Fabio Baschetti (2013–14)
 Paolo Tarini (2014–15)
 Matteo Cecchetti (2015–16)
 Fabrizio Constantini (2016–17)
 Loris Martinini (2017)
 Gori Massimo (2017–19)
 Achille Fabbri (2019–)

References

External links
Official page

 
1966 establishments in San Marino
Association football clubs established in 1966
Football clubs in San Marino
Sport in the City of San Marino
Former Italian football clubs